Fernando Núñez Lázaro (born 28 June 1978), often known simply as Fernando, is a Spanish retired footballer who played as a defender.

Club career
Born in Barcelona, Catalonia, Núñez graduated from RCD Espanyol's youth system, making his senior debuts with the reserves in the 1998–99 season, in Segunda División B. On 24 July 1999 he appeared in his first and only game as a professional, playing the last 34 minutes in a 1–2 away loss against Montpellier HSC for the UEFA Intertoto Cup.

In the following years, Núñez competed in his native region and the lower leagues, representing UE Figueres, CE Mataró, CE Europa and AE Prat.

References

External links
 
 
 

1978 births
Living people
Footballers from Barcelona
Spanish footballers
Association football defenders
Segunda División B players
Tercera División players
RCD Espanyol B footballers
RCD Espanyol footballers
UE Figueres footballers
CE Mataró players
CE Europa footballers
AE Prat players